The Tianshui–Longnan railway is a planned railway in China. The project is in the design phase as of 2021.

The line will take a north-south route, connecting with the Longhai railway and the Tianshui–Pingliang railway in the north, and the Chongqing–Lanzhou railway in the south.

History
Construction began in November 2020 and is expected to take five and a half years with a cost of 24.323 billion yuan. However in 2021 it was reported that the project was in the preliminary design phase and would commence construction again by the end of that year.

Stations 
Yangjianian (existing station on Tianshui–Pingliang Railway), Panjizhai, Maijishan, Niangniangba, Liziyuan, Mayan, Jiangluo, Shuiquan, Chengxian, Xixia, Taishi, Pingluo (Kang County), Foya, Anhua, Majie, Liangshui, Longnan West railway station (existing station on Chongqing–Lanzhou railway).

References

Railway lines in China
Transport in Gansu